Old Tunnel State Park is a railroad tunnel of the Fredericksburg and Northern Railway, which ceased operations in 1942.  The property came under the care of Texas Parks and Wildlife Department, and was officially made a state park in 2012.  It is located halfway between Fredericksburg and Comfort on Old San Antonio Road. Since the shut down of the railway, the tunnel has become a bat cave, hosting over 3 million Mexican free-tailed bats and 3000 Cave myotis bats.  The bats emerge at sunset during the months of May through October, and viewing is open to the public.

At 16.1 acres, it is the smallest state park in Texas.

See also
List of Texas state historic sites

Citations

External links 
 Official Site

Texas state historic sites
Protected areas of Gillespie County, Texas
Protected areas of Kendall County, Texas
Protected areas established in 2012
Bat conservation
Bats of the United States